Pereschepyne is a town in Novomoskovsk Raion of Dnipropetrovsk Oblast (province), Ukraine. It is located 70 miles north of Dnipro. Pereshchepyne hosts the administration of Pereshchepyne urban hromada, one of the hromadas of Ukraine. Population:  In 2001, the population was 10,041.

Gallery

References

External links

Cities in Dnipropetrovsk Oblast
Yekaterinoslav Governorate
Cities of district significance in Ukraine
Populated places established in the Russian Empire